The Return of Red Emma is the third studio album by the singer/songwriter Lida Husik, released in 1993 by Shimmy Disc.

Critical reception
Trouser Press wrote that "the swirling moods seem less to spring mysteriously from the songs themselves — as they do on Bozo — than to be draped over them. It sounds oddly unsettled and tired at the same time."

Track listing

Personnel
Adapted from The Return of Red Emma liner notes.

 Lida Husik – lead vocals, guitar, bass guitar, keyboards, production
Musicians
 Jamie Harley – drums, percussion
 Kramer – bass guitar (2, 3, 11), Hammond organ (2, 11)

Production and additional personnel
 DAM – design
 Michael Macioce – photography
 Ron Paul – production, engineering

Release history

References

External links 
 

1993 albums
Lida Husik albums
Shimmy Disc albums